Bertha Jane Grundy (24 August 1837 – 5 September 1912) was an English novelist born in Moss-side, Lancashire. She also wrote as Mrs. Leith-Adams and Mrs. R. S. de Courcey Laffan. Later in life she wrote poetry and drama, and gave practical lectures to women writers.

Private life
Bertha Jane was born on 24 August 1837 as the eldest daughter of Frederick Grundy, a solicitor, and Jane, née Beardoe. She was first married on 26 October 1859 to Andrew Leith Adams and moved with him to Malta, where the older of her two sons, the writer Francis Adams, was born.

Adams died in 1882, but nine years later, Grundy married Rev. Robert Stuart de Courcy Laffan, who became Headmaster of King Edward VI School, Stratford-upon-Avon (1885–1895), Principal of Cheltenham College, Cheltenham (1895–1899) and Rector of St Stephen Walbrook, London (1899–1927). Both her sons died young, the younger of tuberculosis in Queensland in 1892, and the older, also tubercular, by committing suicide in Margate in 1893.

Grundy's other interests, apart from her writing, included playing the piano and keeping dogs.

Bertha Jane Grundy died at her home in Eccleston Square, Pimlico, London, on 5 September 1912.

Work
Grundy's first publication, a short story entitled "Keane Malcombe's Pupil", appeared in 1876 in All the Year Round, where she was on the staff from 1895. Her most successful work was Geoffrey Stirling (1883), "which described a wife's revenge on the man who killed her husband."

Turning later to poetry (two volumes), drama and non-fiction, she wrote several practical lectures addressed to other women writers, urging them, for instance, "to do nothing without being paid."

Bibliography

References

External links
www.authorandbookinfo.com

1837 births
1912 deaths
19th-century British women writers
19th-century British writers
20th-century British women writers
19th-century English novelists
20th-century English novelists
Pseudonymous women writers
19th-century pseudonymous writers
20th-century pseudonymous writers